"Fluffy" is a song by English alternative rock band Wolf Alice. It was released on 11 February 2013 through Chess Club Records as their debut single. A new, re-recorded version of the song was later featured on their debut studio album, My Love Is Cool (2015). Regarding the new version, they said, "when we started to make the album, we were really upset, 'cause we thought the old recording never sounded very good. It didn't do the song justice, so we wanted to re-record it. So it's quite nice to go full circle and put the first song we released on the album."

Music video
The music video for "Fluffy" was uploaded to the band's YouTube channel on 14 February 2013. The video's director Fabio Youniss stated that the video is about "boredom, misspent youth and a neutered cat," as well as "how Wolf Alice came together."

Track listing

Personnel
Credits adapted from the liner notes of "Fluffy".
 Ben Roulston – production
 Austen Jux-Chandler – engineering
 Tom Upex – engineering assistant
 Mike Merkenschlager – photography

References

2013 songs
2013 debut singles
Songs written by Ellie Rowsell
Wolf Alice songs